UAM Cuajimalpa is the fourth of the five campuses of the Universidad Autónoma Metropolitana (UAM). It is located in the western part of Mexico City. It was created in 2005 to respond to the high demand of a high quality public higher education in that part of the Mexico city. Currently is located in Avenida Prolongación Vasco de Quiroga 4871, colonia Santa Fe Cuajimalpa, Delegación Cuajimalpa de Morelos, México, Distrito Federal, C.P. 05300. It had three temporary locations until December 2013, one in Delegación Álvaro Obregón (Campus Artificios), and the others in Delegación Miguel Hidalgo (Campus Constituyentes 647 and 1054). The university occupied his definitive campus on January 6, 2014 in the area of Santa Fe, where all the activities of UAM Cuajimalpa take place. The academic activities are organized in three main areas, called divisions:

 Social Science and Humanities
 Communication, Information Technology and Design
 Natural Science, Computer Science, Mathematics and Engineering

It is the only university in Mexico where more than 90% of the academics have a PhD. Its educational model is composed of the following elements: philosophic, social, theoric, and political. Its objective is to give a high quality humanistic education focused on an inter-disciplinary formation, being flexible and with connection to the social dynamics and needs of Mexico and the world. As in the other campuses of the UAM, the programs are structured by trimesters which are:

 Autumn (September–December)
 Winter (January–March)
 Spring (April–July)

All its undergraduate programs contain a trimester mandatory for mobility to another campus of UAM, or another university. Currently, UAM Cuajimalpa offers the following degrees:

Communication Sciences
Design
Technologies and Information Systems
Biological Engineering
Molecular Biology
Applied Mathematics
Computer Engineering
Management
Law
Humanistic Studies
Socio-territorial Studies

And also three Ph. D. degrees on
 Biological Science
 Informatics, Design and Communications (MADIC)
 Social Sciences and Humanities

References

External links 
 UAM-Institutional site for the 5 campuses (in Spanish)
 UAM-Cuajimalpa site (in Spanish)

Universities in Mexico City
Cuajimalpa